Wurmbea odorata is a species of plant in the Colchicaceae family that is endemic to Australia.

Description
The species is a cormous perennial herb that grows to a height of 10–24 cm. Its white flowers appear from June to September.

Distribution and habitat
The species is found in the Carnarvon and Yalgoo IBRA bioregions of western Western Australia. It grows in red sand soils, sometimes over limestone substrates.

References

odorata
Monocots of Australia
Angiosperms of Western Australia
Plants described in 1980
Taxa named by Terry Desmond Macfarlane